Love Cruise is an American reality TV show broadcast on Fox in 2001.

The show featured 16 singles (8 men, and 8 women) competing for a $250,000 prize on a cruise. 
The original premiere date of the show was September 11, 2001 but it was delayed for two weeks from its intended broadcast due to news coverage of the 9/11 attacks.

External links
 Official Website, archived December 5, 2001

References

American dating and relationship reality television series
2000s American reality television series
2001 American television series debuts
Impact of the September 11 attacks on television
2001 American television series endings
Television series by Bunim/Murray Productions
Fox Broadcasting Company original programming